Advantage Controls is a family-owned company based in Muskogee, Oklahoma that specializes in water treatment equipment and accessories. In 2014, the company was awarded with the Governor's Award for Excellence in Exporting, by Oklahoma's Secretary of State Chris Benge. Advantage Controls has equipment in every continent barring Antarctica.

History 
Advantage Controls was started in 1994, in the 1,100 foot garage of the owner Dick Morris and son Chris Morris in Downtown Muskogee, Oklahoma. In 1995, Dan Morris assumed control of Advantage Controls and remains as CEO of the company.

Since its establishment in 1994, the Advantage Controls plant has expanded twice and is now located in the Muskogee Industrial Park in a plant covering over 50,000 square feet. In 2013, Advantage was ranked one of the largest manufactures in the city of Muskogee and has over 145 employees.

Products 
Advantage Controls offers a wide array of controllers, metering pumps, and accessories. The company fuses internet communication and electronic controls to improve the user friendliness of their devices.

Controllers 
Advantage Controls has the widest selection of controllers. Their signature controller is the MegaTron, which also comes in a more compact SS model. The MegaTron come with its own online communications software, Web Advantage, that allows the controller to be remotely monitored and sends email to keep users informed. Advantage Controls also offers the NanoTron, MicroTron, and analog controllers.

Pumps

Accessories

Awards

References

1994 establishments in Oklahoma
American companies established in 1994
Companies based in Oklahoma
Muskogee, Oklahoma